Macrocephalochelys is an extinct genus of turtles in the family Chelydridae. It was first described from a partial skull from the Pliocene found in Ukraine by Piboplichko and Taraschchuk in 1960. It was assigned to the family Chelydridae by R. L. Carroll in 1988 although it had been hypothesised to belong in Chelydridae by Chkhikvadze in 1971.

References

Chelydridae
Pliocene turtles
Pliocene reptiles of Europe
Prehistoric turtle genera
Fossil taxa described in 1960
Extinct turtles